Todor Skalovski (21 January 1909 – 1 July 2004) was a Macedonian composer, chorus and orchestra conductor who wrote the music to North Macedonia's national anthem "Denes nad Makedonija". He is regarded as one of the most distinguished composers there. Skalovski is also regarded as one of the trailblazers in composing music inspired by and incorporating Macedonian culture and mythology.

References

Further reading
Conference notes on Skalovski

External links
Composers association of Macedonia – SOCOM

1909 births
2004 deaths
Macedonian choral conductors
Macedonian composers
Male composers
Macedonian conductors (music)
Male conductors (music)
20th-century composers
People from Tetovo
National anthem writers
Yugoslav musicians
20th-century conductors (music)
20th-century male musicians